Rajni Patel (1915–1982) was an Indian politician and barrister. He is well known for being a member of the group of top lawyers that defended Naval Commander Kawas Manekshaw Nanavati in the Prem Ahuja Murder case. 

He was grandfather of Bollywood actress Ameesha Patel.

Life

He was born in Sarsa, near Anand, in Bombay Presidency, British India on 9 January 1915. He participated in the Swadeshi Movement launched by Mahatma Gandhi and was jailed in his early teens for picketing outside liquor shops. He went to the UK for higher studies in the early 1930s. In 1939, he qualified as a barrister from London and practiced in Mumbai. In London, he came in contact with Jawaharlal Nehru who encouraged Rajni to travel to the US and other places to gather support for the Indian independence movement. When Rajni returned to Mumbai by ship, Nehru stood at the Gateway of India to receive him. However, the British authorities did not permit him to disembark and instead arrested him on the ship and took him to Nashik jail.

After his career as a barrister, Patel joined the Indian National Congress in the late 1960s. He had been close to then Prime Minister Indira Gandhi. In the early 1970s, he was made the president of the Mumbai Pradesh Congress Committee.

The Nehru Centre situated in Worli, Mumbai, was conceptualized by him in 1972. The Centre consists of a planetarium, an art gallery, a permanent exposition called, "Discovery of India," and a science laboratory for students.
 
He married Bakul Patel, who later became sheriff of Mumbai in 1992. Bollywood actress Ameesha Patel is his granddaughter. He died on 3 May 1982.

Recognition

In 1986, a forked road off Marine Drive at Nariman Point area in Mumbai was named after him.

Literature
His wife has written a memoir entitled, "Remembering Rajni."

References 

Politicians from Mumbai
Gujarati people
Indian National Congress politicians from Maharashtra
1915 births
1982 deaths